The 1986 Kerry Senior Football Championship was the 86th staging of the Kerry Senior Football Championship since its establishment by the Kerry County Board in 1889.

West Kerry entered the championship as the defending champions, however, they were beaten by Killarney in the second round.

The final was played on 5 October 1986 at Austin Stack Park in Tralee, between Austin Stacks and Killarney, in what was their first ever meeting in the final. Austin Stacks won the match by 1-11 to 1-07 to claim their 10th championship title overall and a first title in seven years.

Mikey Sheehy was the championship's top scorer with 2-27.

Results

First round

Second round

Quarter-finals

Semi-finals

Final

Championship statistics

Top scorers

Overall

In a single game

Miscellaneous

 Austin Stacks win their first title since 1979.
 Austin Stacks move level with John Mitchels at the top of the Roll of Honor with 10 titles.

References

Kerry Senior Football Championship
1986 in Gaelic football